Green tree frog is a common name for several different tree frog species:
American green tree frog (Hyla cinerea), a frog in the family Hylidae found in the southern United States
Australian green tree frog (Litoria caerulea), a frog in the family Hylidae native to Australia and New Guinea
Emerald green tree frog (Rhacophorus prasinatus), a frog in the family Rhacophoridae endemic to northern Taiwan

See also 
 GTF (disambiguation)

Animal common name disambiguation pages

th:กบต้นไม้สีเขียว